Dimitrije Levajac (born 14 August 2001) is a Serbian table tennis player who competed in 2020 Summer Olympics in men's singles and men's team. He was eliminated in singles in first round by Russian table tennis player Kirill Skachkov. He also competes in the Team Tournament.

References

External links

Serbian male table tennis players
2001 births
Living people
Olympic table tennis players of Serbia
Table tennis players at the 2020 Summer Olympics
Sportspeople from Banja Luka
Serbs of Bosnia and Herzegovina
Competitors at the 2022 Mediterranean Games
Mediterranean Games competitors for Serbia
21st-century Serbian people